Cylindrepomus peregrinus is a species of beetle in the family Cerambycidae. It was described by Francis Polkinghorne Pascoe in 1858.

Subspecies
 Cylindrepomus peregrinus peregrinus Pascoe, 1858
 Cylindrepomus peregrinus samarensis Dillon & Dillon, 1948

References

Dorcaschematini
Beetles described in 1858